WDVA is a Black Gospel formatted broadcast radio station licensed to Danville, Virginia, serving Danville and Chatham in Virginia and Eden and Yanceyville in North Carolina.  WDVA is owned and operated by Mitchell Communications, Inc.

References

External links
 Great Gospel 1250 WDVA Online

1947 establishments in Virginia
Gospel radio stations in the United States
Radio stations established in 1947
DVA